Nepal POMSOGIESC (People of Marginalized Sexual Orientation, Gender Identity and Sex Characteristics) Pride Parade, known as Nepal Pride Parade in short, is organized on every second Saturday of June. The Pride March is organized by Queer Youth Group in collaboration with Queer Rights Collective. Since 2020, Campaign for Change (intersex rights organization) has also been involved. This Pride March marked establishment of first independent Pride Parade in Nepal.

2022
The fourth annual Nepal Pride Parade was conducted in physical attendance after two years of virtual momentum. The parade was gathered at Fibwakhya (Maitighar) and concluded at New Baneshwar. There were speeches in multiple indigenous languages with sign language interpretation.

2021
The third annual Nepal Pride Parade was also conducted virtually. Events included:-
 Social Media Posting (Before 1 pm)
 Tweetathon and Instathon (11 am to 12:30 pm)
 Video  Screening (1 pm to 3 pm)
 Networking Event (3:30 pm to 4:30 pm)
 Dance Party (5 pm to 6 pm)

2020
Due to the COVID-19 pandemic the second annual Nepal Pride Parade was conducted online. The day started with Tweetathon & Instathon that led to virtual sessions being conducted. Events included:- 
 Video Posting "What is Pride for you?" (Before 11 am)
 Tweetathon and Instathon (11 am to 1 pm)
 Mental Health and Us : Webinar (1:30 pm to 2:45 pm)
 Intersectionality in the Queer Movement : Webinar (3 pm to 4:30 pm)
 Networking Event (5 pm to 7pm)

2019
The first parade drew around four hundred people on the busy streets of Maitighar Mandala. The first pride march was organized on June 29, 2019, which declared second Saturday of June to be celebrated as Pride Day in Nepal.

In 2019, people gathered at Maitighar Mandala (Fibwa Khya) in the morning and marched towards New Baneshwar (Khunthoo). Around 400 people showed up. People held Rainbow Pride Flag, Bisexual Pride Flag, Transgender Pride Flag, Genderqueer Pride Flag, Genderfluid Pride Flag, Intersex Pride Flag along with slogans in four different languages. The theme of the pride march was 'Inclusion of queer (gender and sexual minorities) at all levels of state and decision-making process.

Gallery

Nepal Pride Parade, 2019

See also
 LGBT rights in Nepal
 Pride parades in Nepal

References

Pride parades
Festivals in Nepal
Parades in Nepal
2019 establishments in Nepal
Recurring events established in 2019
LGBT events in Nepal